was a Japanese Rinzai Zen rōshi and Neo-Confucianist.

Kosen did his Zen training under Daisetsu Shoen (1797–1855) at Sōkoku-ji and received inka from Gisan Zenkai at Sōgen-ji in Okayama. Kosen was instrumental in bringing Zen to lay practitioners and to the west. Kosen's Dharma heir Soyen Shaku participated in the World Parliament of Religions in Chicago, which introduced Soyen Shaku's student D. T. Suzuki to Paul Carus and western Theosophy. Kosen's dharma descendant Tetsuo Sōkatsu established Ningen Zen Kyodan, an independent lay-Rinzai school.

As one-time head abbot of Engakuji in Kamakura, Japan, he was known as a government loyalist and is remembered for his support of Emperor Meiji—in the 1870s serving as Doctrinal Instructor for the Ministry of Doctrine.

See also
 Buddhism in Japan
 List of Rinzai Buddhists
 Ningen Zen

Successors
 Kawajiri Hokin
 Soyen Shaku
 Tetsuo Sōkatsu

See also
 Ningen Zen Kyodan

References

Sources

Japanese Confucianists
Rinzai Buddhists
Zen Buddhist abbots
1816 births
1892 deaths
Japanese Zen Buddhists
Edo period Buddhist clergy